The Road to Jenin is a 2003 documentary directed by Pierre Rehov, a French-Algerian film director of Jewish descent, whose documentaries mostly deal with the Middle East conflict. The Road to Jenin was produced to counter the Palestinian narrative in relation to the Battle of Jenin, a clash between the Israeli army and Palestinian militants in April 2002 which drew Palestinian accounts of a "Jenin Massacre". This film was also a response to  Mohammed Bakri's film entitled Jenin, Jenin.

Content
Rehov's film begins some time before Israel's Operation Defensive Shield in Jenin with the Passover Seder bombing in Netanya, referred to in Israel as the Passover massacre, in which some 30 Israeli civilians were killed and 140 injured by a terrorist bomb.  Operation Defensive Shield was launched in April 2002 response to this March 27 bombing, as well as two previous attacks that killed 18.

Israel Channel One, which showed the film on its program Prime Time, said of it:
"In the last section of the film, the film director, Pierre Rehov, travels to Jenin to interview Palestinians to get their side of the story - but Palestinian were caught in their own lies. For instance, a Palestinian journalist was caught staging a woman giving birth at a checkpoint. Or a Palestinian doctor shows a wing of the hospital that is supposed to have been destroyed by Tsahal. Despite the tense atmosphere and the constant danger, Tsahal soldiers assist Palestinians civilians. One soldier opens a can of food for an old lady who blesses him. A few other soldiers bring boxes of food to a Palestinian family and children.

According to the UN, the Palestinians losses amount to 52, 40 of whom were fighters; whereas the Israeli Army, Tsahal, lost 23 soldiers. Not even close to the Palestinians' accusation of a massacre."

References

External links
 The Road to Jenin YouTube (video.google)
 The Road to Jenin (from Pierre Rehov's website)
 Movies of the Year Hannah Brown
 Jenin - Massacring Truth, Frank Kitman © The Calgary Herald 2004

Films about the Israel Defense Forces
2003 films
Documentary films about the Israeli–Palestinian conflict
2003 documentary films
Jenin